For main Top 5 Division, see: 2008 Asian Five Nations

The 2008 Asian Five Nations division tournaments, known as the 2008 HSBC Asian 5 Nations due to the tournament's sponsorship by the HSBC, refer to the Asian Five Nations divisions played within the tournament. This was the 1st series of the Asian Five Nations, following the merge of the ARFU Asian Rugby Series and Asian Rugby Championship.

There were two main divisions, with three further regional divisions. The winners of Division 1 would be promoted up to the Top Division for 2009, as will the winner of Division 2 being promoted to Division 1. The loser of Division 1, drops to Division 2.

Scoring system: 5 points for a win, three for a draw, one bonus point for being within seven points of the winning team, and one for four tries.

Teams
The teams involved, with their world rankings pre tournament, were:

Division 1
  (48)
  (55)
  (50)

Division 2
  (81)
  (79)
  (NA)
  (65)

South-East Asia Division
  (NA)
  (NA)
  (NA)

Pacific-Asia Division
  (NA)
  (83)
  (NA)

Central Asia Division
  (NA)
  (NA)
  (NA)

Other Regions
  (NA)
  (NA)
  (NA)

Division 1

Standings

China withdrew due to lack of visa availability and were relegated to Division Two.
Standings were determined according to the same method used in the HSBC Asian Five Nations championship.
Singapore promoted to main tournament for 2009 edition.

Fixtures

Division 2

Division Two served as the first round of qualifying for the 2011 Rugby World Cup, as the Division Two champion would be promoted to Division One for 2009 and have the opportunity to be promoted to the HSBC Asian Five Nations for the 2010 season.  The 2010 HSBC Asian Five Nations will be the final qualifying stage for the Asian representative at the 2011 Rugby World Cup.

Fixtures

Semi finals

Third v Fourth Final

Final

Tournament winner Thailand promoted to Division One for 2009.
There will be no relegation for fourth placed team Pakistan.

Regional Divisions

South-East Asia

Pacific-Asia

Central Asia

Other Regions

Cancelled

References

External links

Asian 5 nations  on itsrugby.co.uk
Pakistan Rugby Union

2008
2008 in Asian rugby union
Asia